Luna Lake is a natural body of water that covers approximately  of land.

Luna Lake has the distinction of being part of the San Francisco River, flowing easterly into New Mexico, then south, and west into the Gila River (in Arizona). The headwaters are north of the other main mountain tributary to the Gila, the Blue River of Arizona.

Location
It’s accessible year-round, but ices over in winter months.

Description
Luna Lake is a  impoundment of the upper San Francisco River. It is stocked annually with fingerling and subcatchable rainbow and cutthroat trout. Because it is a shallow, nutrient-rich lake, it is subject to water quality problems and excessive weed growth. The Arizona Game and Fish Department annually harvests weeds to help alleviate some of the water quality problems.

Fauna and flora

The following species are noted at Luna Lake.
 Gray catbird, (South and West of most westerly ranges in New Mexico, and Colorado.)
 Southwestern willow flycatcher
 Bald eagle
 Mexican spotted owl
 Myotis occultus, the Arizona myotis, a mouse-eared bat
 Northern leopard frog
 Chiricahua leopard frog
 Clover: Trifolium neurophyllum, "White Mountains clover"
 Gila groundsel, Senecio quaerens, Senecio

Fish species
 Rainbow trout
 Yellowstone cutthroat trout

References

External links
 Luna Lake Wildlife Area at the Arizona Game and Fish Department
 Arizona Boating Locations Facilities Map
 Arizona Fishing Locations Map

Wildlife areas of Arizona
White Mountains (Arizona)
Lakes of Apache County, Arizona
Lakes of Arizona
Apache-Sitgreaves National Forests